There are 45 routes assigned to the "J" zone of the California Route Marker Program, which designates county routes in California. The "J" zone includes county highways in Alameda, Calaveras, Contra Costa, Fresno, Kern, Inyo, Mariposa, Merced, Sacramento, San Benito, San Joaquin, Stanislaus, and Tulare counties.

J1

County Route J1 (CR J1) is a county highway in San Benito and Fresno counties in the U.S. state of California. It runs from State Route 25 in Paicines to State Route 33 in Mendota. The route is known as Panoche Road, Little Panoche Road, Shields Avenue, Fairfax Avenue, and Belmont Avenue.

The route begins in Paicines in San Benito County at State Route 25.  Between Paicines and Panoche Valley, CR J1 is known as Panoche Road.  Its north–south portion between Panoche Valley and Fresno County is called Little Panoche Road. In Fresno County, the route then intersects with Interstate 5 and terminates in Mendota at State Route 33 near State Route 180 in the Central Valley. East of Interstate 5, the alignment of CR J1 follows Fresno County's West Shields Avenue (which is exit 379 off of Interstate 5). Shields Avenue ends at North Fairfax Avenue. CR J1 continues south  on Fairfax Avenue to West Belmont Avenue, where CR J1 proceeds east on Belmont Avenue until its end at SR 33 in Mendota. Belmont Avenue continues east without the county route designation to SR 180.

Panoche Road lies within the corridor of an unbuilt Route 180 segment. No current plan exists to extend Route 180 westward from Mendota past Interstate 5 and into San Benito County.

Parts of J1 just west of I-5 are gravel rather than paved.

Major intersections

J2

County Route J2 (CR J2), or I-580 Alternate, is a county highway that is made up of a series of streets and roads in Alameda and San Joaquin counties in the U.S. state of California. It runs from the Portola Avenue overpass at Interstate 580 in Livermore to State Route 4 near the community of Holt. The route is known as portions of Portola Avenue and Livermore Avenue, Tesla Road, Corral Hollow Road, and portions of Lammers Road and Tracy Boulevard.

Route description
County Route J2 begins at the Portola Avenue overcrossing of Interstate 580 in Livermore. It was a former partial interchange that closed permanently in 2011 due to the interchange that opened with Isabel Avenue (State Route 84) west of Portola. The route follows Portola to Livermore Avenue, where CR J2 turns southward to pass through Livermore's downtown.  The highway continues past the southeast edge of Livermore to become Tesla Road and rise into the Diablo Range, which separates the outer San Francisco Bay Area from the San Joaquin Valley.

At the Alameda-San Joaquin county line, CR J2 becomes Corral Hollow Road and enters the narrow valley of the same name.  Upon approaching the San Joaquin Valley, the road turns northward, meeting Interstate 580 again and arriving at the southern subdivisions of Tracy.  After passing through this city, the road passes under Interstate 205 (with no access), shifts briefly onto Lammers Road, and soon turns northward onto Tracy Boulevard. CR J2 then crosses the sea-level Union and Roberts Islands in the San Joaquin-Sacramento River Delta before terminating at State Route 4.

Major intersections

J3

It runs from State Route 132 east of Vernalis to State Route 12 (Kettleman Lane) in Lodi. The route is known as Kasson Road, Airport Way, West Lane, and Hutchins Street.

Route description
After almost  the route meets Airport Way and follows it northward  past Manteca, Lathrop, and French Camp into Stockton. CR J3 then follows West Lane  out from Stockton and becomes Hutchins Street for the route's last . The route reaches its northern end at State Route 12 in Lodi.

The highway is also known as Stanislaus County Route J3 and San Joaquin County Route J3, though all but  of the route is within San Joaquin County.

Major intersections

J4

County Route J4 (CR J4) is a county highway in the U.S. state of California that runs  nominally north–south across portions of San Joaquin, Alameda, and Contra Costa counties that are growing in population and suburbanization.  The route connects the suburbs of the far outer East Bay and the Sacramento River Delta with the northern San Joaquin Valley, running from Airport Way and Kasson Road (County Route J3) to State Route 4 near Discovery Bay. It is known as Durham Ferry Road, Kasson Road, Grant Line Road, Byron Road, Byron Bethany Highway, and Byron Highway.

The portion between Tracy and Brentwood lies along the unconstructed corridor of State Route 239.  SAFETEA-LU, federal legislation enacted in 2005, authorized $14 million in federal appropriations toward construction of the route.

Major intersections

J5

County Route J5 (CR J5) is a county highway in San Joaquin County, California, United States. It runs for about 30 miles (49 km), from State Route 99 in Ripon to Peltier Road (County Route J12) north of Lockeford. It is known as Jack Tone Road and Elliot Road.

Route description
County Route J5 begins at State Route 99's interchange with Jack Tone Road in Ripon. Following Jack Tone Road, CR J5 passes through SR 120 east of Manteca and State Routes 4 and 26 east of Stockton. Eventually, it curves northwest where it is then co-routed with State Routes 12 and 88 at a right turn in Lockeford for a short distance before leaving SR 12 / SR 88 at a left turn at Elliot Road. It eventually leads to Peltier Road (CR J12), where CR J5 ends.

Major intersections

J6

County Road J6 (CR J6) is a county highway in Stanislaus and San Joaquin counties in the U.S. state of California. It runs from State Route 108 near Del Rio to State Route 26 in Bellota. The route is known as McHenry Avenue, Escalon Avenue in Escalon, and Escalon-Bellota Road.

Route description
County Route J6 begins at the junction with State Route 108 near Del Rio. It continues north as McHenry Avenue to the junction with State Route 120 in Escalon. Continuing north as Escalon Avenue, it becomes Escalon-Bellota Road as it leaves Escalon, eventually crossing State Route 4 in Farmington and ending at its northern terminus at State Route 26 in Bellota, 4 miles east of Linden.

Major intersections

J7

County Route J7 (CR J7) is a county highway in Merced, Stanislaus and San Joaquin counties in the U.S. state of California. It mostly parallels State Route 99 to the east and generally follows the BNSF Railway between Merced and Stockton. It also connects several smaller communities including Atwater, Winton, Cressey, Ballico, Denair, Hughson, Empire, Riverbank, and Escalon. CR J7 runs from State Route 59 and West Olive Avenue in Merced to SR 99 in Stockton. The route is known as Santa Fe Drive, Santa Fe Avenue, Claus Road, First Street in Riverbank, Santa Fe Road, Main Street and Escalon Avenue in Escalon, Escalon-Bellota Road, and Mariposa Road.

Route description
The southern terminus for CR J7 is at State Route 59 in Merced, locally known as the Snelling Highway. The route is locally signed as Santa Fe Drive. From this point, it travels northwest for 12 mi through Merced County, passing by the former site of Castle Air Force Base in Atwater.  Upon crossing the Merced River, the route continues in Stanislaus County as Santa Fe Avenue for another 20 mi until it reaches the community of Empire. In Empire, the route briefly co-signs with SR 132 (locally signed as Yosemite Boulevard) for just over 1 mi before turning onto Claus Road, where it skirts the eastern edge of Modesto. The route follows Claus Road for approximately 6.5 mi, passing the former site of the Riverbank Army Ammunition Plant as well as the Rainbow Fields sports park.

CR J7 then follows SR 108 (locally signed as Atchison Street) westward in Riverbank for approximately 0.9 mi before turning onto First Street and continuing on a north-south trajectory.  Once it crosses the Stanislaus River and enters San Joaquin County, the route is locally signed as Santa Fe Road. At this point, it continues its parallel path with the BNSF rail line. About 4.3 mi after entering San Joaquin County, the route then enters Escalon and becomes Main Street for 0.7 mi before reaching SR 120. CR J7 very briefly co-signs with SR 120 before intersecting with CR J6.  The two county routes share the same roadway (locally signed as Escalon Avenue, then Escalon-Bellota Road) for 2.5 mi before CR J7 follows a curve onto Mariposa Road on a northwest-southeast trajectory.

At this point, CR J7 continues on Mariposa Road, a mostly rural road.  While on Mariposa Road, CR J7 passes just north of the BNSF Stockton Intermodal Yard. The county route eventually meets its northern terminus with SR 99 in eastern Stockton.

Major intersections

J8

County Route J8 (CR J8) is a county highway in San Joaquin and Sacramento counties in the U.S. state of California. It mostly parallels Interstate 5 to the east and generally follows the Union Pacific Railroad between Stockton and Sacramento. CR J8 runs from State Route 99 at Hammer Lane in Stockton to SR 99 at Broadway in Sacramento. The route is known as Hammer Lane in Stockton, Thornton Road, Franklin Boulevard, and a tiny portion of Broadway in Sacramento.

Route description
County Route J8 starts at the interchange of Hammer Lane and State Route 99 in Stockton.  The route proceeds west on Hammer Lane to the intersection of Thornton Road, then turns northwest, following Thornton Road from Stockton to the Sacramento County line north of Thornton.
North of Thornton, the route proceeds slightly away from I-5 until it parallels the Union Pacific Railroad and crosses the Cosumnes River into Sacramento County.  From here the route is known as Franklin Boulevard and proceeds north to the town of Franklin.  Northbound traffic must turn east onto Bilby Road to cross the railroad, then turn north on Willard Parkway to rejoin Franklin Boulevard south of its junction with Elk Grove Boulevard (CR E12).  Southbound traffic follows the original alignment of Franklin Boulevard to cross the railroad tracks.  The route continues north through Elk Grove and parts of the city of Sacramento before its junction with SR 99 at Broadway in Sacramento.

Major intersections

J9

County Route J9 (CR J9) is a county highway in Stanislaus and San Joaquin counties in the U.S. state of California. It is the main route between the cities of Turlock, Waterford, and Oakdale. It is especially busy during the morning and evening rush hours. The route is primarily rural, only traveling through a few cities, all with fewer than 20,000 people. CR J9 runs from East Avenue (County Route J17) east of Turlock to Interstate 5 in Stockton. The route is known as Hickman Road, F Street in Waterford, Oakdale-Waterford Highway, Albers Road, Yosemite Avenue in Oakdale, Valley Home Road, Lone Tree Road, and French Camp Road.

Route description
This road begins at Interstate 5 near Stockton. It then continues east through French Camp and south Stockton to SR 99. From here, the route is primarily rural. It then travels through Valley Home southbound. Next it crosses the Stanislaus River into Oakdale, passes the old Hershey's plant, and continues over the Hetch Hetchy Aqueduct. It then turns sharply left and becomes the Oakdale-Waterford Highway, through Waterford. Exiting Waterford, it crosses the Tuolumne River into Hickman and stays rural through to its terminus at J17. 

Major intersections

J10

County Route J10 (CR J10) is a county highway in the U.S. state of California that connects the northern section of Stockton in San Joaquin County with the city of Galt in Sacramento County.  A majority of the route is locally signed as Lower Sacramento Road, with Turner Road connecting the two segments of Lower Sacramento Road. In Galt, it is known as Lincoln Way. The route also connects through the city of Lodi, as well as the historic community of Woodbridge.

Route description
CR J10 begins at Hammer Lane (County Route J8) at its southern terminus.  It then travels approximately 7 mi until it reaches the southern border of Lodi.  From there, it continues another 2 mi to Turner Road. Briefly, Lower Sacramento Road is co-routed with Turner Road for 0.2 mi before again following a north-south route.  The route continues on Lower Sacramento Road for another 10 mi before crossing into Sacramento County.  At this point, the route becomes locally signed as South Lincoln Way.  The route from this point travels another 4 mi, mostly through the city of Galt, before reaching its northern terminus at SR 99.

Major intersections

J11

County Route J11 (CR J11) is a county highway in Sacramento and San Joaquin counties in the U.S. state of California. The route connects State Route 160 in Walnut Grove with Thornton Road (County Route J8) in Thornton. It is known as River Road and Walnut Grove Thornton Road in Sacramento County and Walnut Grove Road in San Joaquin County.

Route description
County Route J11 begins at the junction of State Route 160 at the Walnut Grove Bridge in the town of Walnut Grove. At the eastern end of the bridge, it meets River Road (CR E13). The route proceeds south on River Road briefly along the levee of the Sacramento River and Georgiana Slough before leaving the levee and turning east onto Walnut Grove Thornton Road.  The route crosses into San Joaquin County as Walnut Grove Road at the Mokelumne River and proceeds eastward to the interchange at Interstate 5 before it terminates at the junction of County Route J8 (Thornton Road) in the town of Thornton.

Major intersections

J12

County Route J12 (CR J12) is a county highway in San Joaquin County, California, United States. It runs from Interstate 5 northwest of Lodi to State Route 88 northeast of Clements. Much of the route consists of Peltier Road, along with portions of Tully Road, Jahant Road, Mackville Road, and Collier Road.

Major intersections

J13

County Route J13 (CR J13) is a county highway in San Joaquin County, California, United States. It is known entirely as Tracy Boulevard from Eleventh Street in Tracy to Lammers Road north of Tracy. Apart from an advance shield at its northern end, the route is largely unsigned.

Major intersections

J14

County Route J14 (CR J14) is a county highway in Stanislaus and Calaveras counties in the U.S. state of California. It runs from State Route 99 and State Route 165 in Turlock to State Route 26 near Jenny Lind. The route is known as Lander Avenue, Olive Avenue, Golden State Boulevard, Geer Road, Albers Road, Yosemite Avenue, Twenty Six Mile Road, Sonora Road, Milton Road, and Jenny Lind Road.

Major intersections

J15

County Route J15 (CR J15) is an unsigned county highway in Tulare County, California, United States. It runs from Avenue 96 (CR J24) east of Pixley to State Route 201 near Calgro. The route is also known as Road 140, Lovers Lane, Houston Avenue, Ben Maddox Way, and Road 132.

Major intersections

J16

County Route J16 (CR J16) is a county highway in Stanislaus, Merced, and Mariposa counties in the U.S. state of California. It runs from Interstate 5 west of Westley in the San Joaquin Valley to State Route 49 in Bear Valley in the foothills of the Sierra Nevada. The route is known as Howard Road, Grayson Road, Keyes Road, Merced Falls Road, Hornitos Road, and Bear Valley Road.

Major intersections

J17

County Route J17 (CR J17) is a county highway in Stanislaus and Merced counties in the U.S. state of California. The route is known as Sperry Avenue from Interstate 5 to Patterson, Las Palmas Avenue from Patterson to the San Joaquin River, West Main Street from the San Joaquin River to Turlock, East Avenue from Turlock to Oakdale Road, Oakdale Road from East Avenue to Turlock Road and Turlock Road from Oakdale Road to State Route 59.

Major intersections

J18

County Route J18 (CR J18) is a county highway in Stanislaus and Merced counties in the U.S. state of California. It runs from Interstate 5 near Newman to State Route 99 near Atwater. The route is known as Stuhr Road, Hills Ferry Road, Kelley Road, River Road, and Westside Boulevard.

Route description
County Route J18 begins at its western end at Interstate 5 near Newman. It follows Stuhr Road from I-5 to Hills Ferry Road. It briefly follows Hills Ferry Road to the confluence of the Merced and San Joaquin rivers, where it becomes Kelley Road. It then follows River Road, paralleling the Merced River to the north. As CR J18 reaches State Route 165, it diverges from River Road as it is co-routed with SR 165 for a very brief distance. After departing from SR 165, CR J18 is routed onto Westside Boulevard all the way to its eastern end at State Route 99. The road itself continues as Bellevue Road for a short distance, but does not connect with Bellevue Road in Atwater due to a Dole processing plant currently occupying the road's right-of-way.

Major intersections

J19

County Route J19 (CR J19) is a county highway in Tulare and Fresno counties in the U.S. state of California. It runs from State Route 198 in Visalia to State Route 63 in Orange Cove. The route is known as Plaza Drive, Road 80, Alta Avenue, Manning Avenue, and Hills Valley Road. Apart from a few lingering shields, CR J19 is largely unsigned.

Major intersections

J20

County Route J20 (CR J20) was a county highway in Tuolumne and Mariposa counties in the U.S. state of California. It ran from its western terminus at State Route 49 east and north to State Route 120.  It was the continuation of State Route 132 east of Coulterville. It was renumbered as County Route J132 in 1997 for continuity with the current State Route 132.

J21
.

County Route J21 (CR J21), known entirely as Dry Creek Drive, is an unsigned county highway in Tulare County, California, United States. It runs from State Route 245 (Millwood Drive) near Badger to State Route 216 outside of Woodlake. Defined in 1968, it runs  from an elevation of approximately  near Badger to approximately  near Woodlake.

Major intersections

J22

County Route J22 (CR J22) is an unsigned county highway in Tulare County, California, United States. It runs from Road 16 west of Alpaugh to Old Stage Road in Fountain Springs. The route is known as Avenue 54, Center Avenue in Alpaugh, Borchardt Drive, Avenue 56, and Sierra Avenue in Earlimart.

Major intersections

J23

County Route J23 (CR J23) is an unsigned county highway in Tulare County, California, United States. It runs from State Route 137 east of Tulare to State Route 201 in Seville, passing through the towns of Farmersville and Ivanhoe. The route is known as Road 168, Road 164, Farmersville Boulevard, Avenue 296, Road 158, Avenue 328, and  Avenue 156.

Major intersections

J24

County Route J24 (CR J24) is an unsigned county highway in Tulare County, California, United States. It runs from State Route 99 in Pixley to Old Stage Road east of Terra Bella. The route is known as Terra Bella Avenue, Avenue 95, and Avenue 96.

Major intersections

J25

County Route J25 (CR J25), known entirely as Road 68, is an unsigned county highway in Tulare County, California, United States. It runs from State Route 137 west of Tulare to the overpass of State Route 198 south of Goshen.

CR J25 ended at an at-grade intersection with SR 198 until 2012, when SR 198 was expanded to a four-lane expressway between State Route 43 near Hanford and State Route 99. An overpass was built for CR J25 as part of the expressway project, but is directly inaccessible to and from SR 198. Access to SR 198 is via Aveune 298 and Road 64.

Major intersections

J26

County Route J26 (CR J26) is an unsigned county highway in Tulare County, California, United States. It runs from State Route 99 in Tipton to State Route 65 in Porterville. It is known as Olive Avenue in Tipton and Porterville and Avenue 152 between Tipton and Porterville.

Major intersections

J27

County Route J27 (CR J27) is an unsigned county highway in Tulare County, California, United States. It runs from County Line Road (CR J44) east of Delano to State Route 245 northwest of Woodlake. The route is known as Road 192, a portion of Avenue 192, Road 196, and Millwood Drive.

Major intersections

J28

County Route J28 (CR J28) is an unsigned county highway in Tulare County, California, United States. It runs from Road 196 (CR J27) in Plainview to State Route 190 near Springville.

Major intersections

J29

County Route J29 (CR J29) is an unsigned county highway in Tulare County, California, United States. It runs from State Route 190 in Porterville to State Route 65 in Lindsay. The route is known as Main Street, Orange Belt Drive, Mirage Avenue, and Hermosa Street. Prior to relocating to its current alignment to the west in the 1970s, much of the route is the original alignment of SR 65.

Major intersections

J30

County Route J30 (CR J30) is an unsigned county highway in Tulare County, California, United States. It runs from State Route 99 near Visalia to State Route 65 in Exeter, passing through Visalia and Farmersville. The route is known as Caldwell Avenue, as well as portions of Avenue 280, Visalia Road, Belmont Avenue, and Firebaugh Avenue.

Major intersections

J31

County Route J31 (CR J31) is an unsigned county highway in Tulare County, California, United States. It runs from Avenue 368 (CR J36) east of Traver to Avenue 416 (CR J40) west of Dinuba. The route is known as Road 60, Avenue 384, and Road 56.

Major intersections

J32

J33

County Route J33 (CR J33) is an unsigned county highway in Tulare County, California, United States. It runs from Center Avenue (CR J22) in Alpaugh to State Route 43 south of Corcoran. The route is known as Tule Avenue, Road 38, Kinsman Drive, Road 40, and Avenue 112.

Major intersections

J34

County Route J34 (CR J34), known entirely as Avenue 328, is an unsigned county highway in Tulare County, California, United States. It runs from the overpass of State Route 99 to State Route 216 in Ivanhoe.

Major intersections

J35

County Route J35 (CR J35) is an unsigned county highway in Tulare County, California, United States. It runs from Avenue 4 (CR J44) in Richgrove to Avenue 56 (CR J22) near Ducor. The route is known as Richgrove Drive and Road 232. Much of the route is an original and former alignment of State Route 65 before the state highway was moved to its current alignments. 

Major intersections

J36

County Route J36 (CR J36) is an unsigned county highway in Tulare County, California, United States. It runs from State Route 99 in Traver to Road 132 (CR J15) south of Calgro. The route is known as Merritt Drive and Avenue 368.

Major intersections

J37

County Route J37 (CR J37), known entirely as Balch Park Road, is a county highway in Tulare County, California, United States. It runs from State Route 190 near Springville to near Balch Park in the Sierra Nevada mountains. It is the only signed county route in Tulare County.

Major intersections

J38

County Route J38 (CR J38) is an unsigned county highway in Tulare County, California, United States. It runs from State Route 99 southeast of Kingsburg to State Routes 63 and 201 in Calgro. Most of the route is known as Avenue 384.

Major intersections

J40

County Route J40 (CR J40) is a county highway in Fresno and Tulare counties in the U.S. state of California. It runs from State Route 99 southeast of Selma to State Route 63 in Orosi, passing through the communities of Dinuba and Sultana. The route is known as Mountain View Avenue in Fresno County, Avenue 416 in Tulare County, and El Monte Way within and near the cities of Dinuba and Orosi. Apart from a sporadic number of shields along or near the route, it is largely unsigned.

Major intersections

J41

County Route J41 (CR J41) is an unsigned county highway in Inyo and Tulare County, California, United States. It runs from US 395 near Pearsonville to the Kennedy Meadows Campground in the Sierra Nevada mountains. The route is known as Nine Mile Canyon Road in Inyo County and Kennedy Meadows Road in Tulare County. It is the only county route in Inyo County.

Major intersections

J42

County Route J42 (CR J42) is an unsigned county highway in Tulare County, California, United States. It runs from State Route 190 east of Porterville to the Tule River Reservation. The route is known as Road 284, Avenue 138 and Reservation Road.

Major intersections

J44

County Route J44 (CR J44) is an unsigned county highway in Kern and Tulare counties in the U.S. state of California. It runs from State Route 99 in Delano to Richgrove Drive (CR J35) in Richgrove. Most of the route sits on the Kern-Tulare county line and is known as County Line Road / Avenue 0. It is the only county route in Kern County. In Tulare County, it is known as Road 200 and Avenue 4.

Major intersections

J46

County Route J46 (CR J46), known entirely as Avenue 168, is an unsigned county highway in Tulare County, California, United States. It runs from Road 152 (CR J15) to Road 192 (CR J27), passing through the small community of Woodville.

Major intersections

J59

County Route J59 (CR J59), known entirely as La Grange Road, is a county highway in Merced, Stanislaus, and Tuolumne counties in the U.S. state of California. The route is located in the foothills of the Sierra Nevada. It is the continuation of State Route 59 north of Snelling and connects with State Routes 108 and 120 near the small community of Keystone.

Major intersections

J132

County Route J132 (CR J132) is a county highway in Tuolumne and Mariposa counties in the U.S. state of California. It runs from its western terminus at State Route 49 east and north to State Route 120. It is the continuation of State Route 132 east of Coulterville. The route is known as Greeley Hill Road and Smith Station Road.

CR J132 was numbered CR J20 until 1997.

Major intersections

See also

References

External links
Little Panoche Reservoir along J1.
US Bureau of Reclamation Panoche Dam page.

J*